Salisbury NHS Foundation Trust is an NHS foundation trust based in Salisbury that covers South Wiltshire, North and East Dorset and South West Hampshire. It gained foundation trust status in 2006. Its main site is Salisbury District Hospital, a large general hospital.

Stacey Hunter, who began her career as a nurse, was appointed as chief executive officer in June 2020.

Structure 
In 2013 the trust established a subsidiary company, Salisbury Trading Limited, providing laundry services, to which 77 estates and facilities staff were transferred. The intention was to achieve VAT benefits, as well as pay bill savings, by recruiting new staff on less expensive non-NHS contracts. VAT benefits arise because NHS trusts can only claim VAT back on a small subset of goods and services they buy. The Value Added Tax Act 1994 provides a mechanism through which NHS trusts can qualify for refunds on contracted-out services.

Performance

In September 2014 the trust was placed in the top 100 healthcare employers in the country by the Best Companies Group on the basis of a staff survey on quality of leadership, staff communications, training and development and the working environment. It was named by the Health Service Journal as one of the top hundred NHS trusts to work for in 2015. At that time it had 2752 full time equivalent staff and a sickness absence rate of 3.37%. 83% of staff recommend it as a place for treatment and 75% recommended it as a place to work.

The trust decided to implement a Lorenzo patient record system in August 2015. It expects cash releasing savings of £12m over 10 years.

In March 2016 the Trust was ranked fifth in the Learning from Mistakes League.

See also
 List of NHS trusts

References

External links 
 
 Inspection reports from the Care Quality Commission

NHS foundation trusts
Health in Wiltshire
Organisations based in Wiltshire
Salisbury